Helen Howe  (January 11, 1905 – February 1, 1975) was an American novelist, biographer and monologist.

Early life and education
Helen Huntington Howe was born to Mark Antony DeWolfe Howe and Fanny Huntington Quincy Howe on January 11, 1905. Her father was an author and biographer while her mother was known as an essayist and author. Her mother was from a long line of Quincys in Boston, stretching back through her great-great-great-grandfather Josiah Quincy Jr. Her brother Quincy went on to become a writer, editor and radio commentator while Mark Antony De Wolfe Howe became a law professor in Harvard University and a biographer.

Howe was educated in private schools in Boston including Milton Academy where she graduated in 1922 before attending Radcliffe College for a year. She also attended the Theatre Guild School in New York. Howe had a skill in mimicry and discovered she enjoyed writing her own character sketches to perform.

Career
She had a career as a monologist for over fifteen years with shows across America. She gave several performances in The White House. In 1936 she took her show to both the Arts Theatre and Mercury Theater in London. Howe also produced books exploring the kinds of characters she portrayed in her sketches. Her first published novel was in 1943. She began the second half of her career more as a novelist.

Personal life
Howe married Reginald Allen who had worked as a curator of the Gilbert and Sullivan Collection in the Pierpont Morgan Library. She lived in New York, on Fifth Avenue. Howe died in 1975. Her service was at the Cathedral Church of St. John the Divine and her grave is in Mount Wollaston Cemetery, Quincy, Massachusetts. Her papers are archived in Harvard.

Bibliography
 The whole heart, 1943
 We happy few, 1946
 The circle of the day, 1950
 The success, 1956
 The fires of autumn,  1959
 The gentle Americans, 1864-1960 : biography of a breed, 1965
 Wheels: biographical sketch of John Brooks Wheelwright, 1966

References and sources

1905 births
1975 deaths
20th-century American women writers
Writers from Boston
20th-century American novelists
American women novelists
20th-century American biographers
American women biographers
Novelists from Massachusetts
Monologists